Rosalie Ida Straus (née Blun; February 6, 1849 – April 15, 1912) was an American homemaker and wife of the co-owner of the Macy's department store.

Early life
Rosalie Ida Blun was born in 1849 in Worms, Germany, to Nathan Blun (1815–1879) and his wife Wilhelmine "Mindel" (née Freudenberg; 1814–1868). She was the fifth of seven children, including Amanda (1839–1907), Elias Nathan (1842–1878), Louis (1843–1927), Augusta Carolina (1845–1905), Moritz (1850–1858) and Abraham Blun (1853–1881). She emigrated to the United States with her family.

In 1871, Ida Blun married Isidor Straus (1845–1912), a German-Jewish American businessman. She and Isidor had seven children:  
 Jesse Isidor Straus (1872–1936) who married Irma Nathan (1877–1970), and served as U.S. Ambassador to France, 1933–1936
 Clarence Elias Straus (1874–1876) who died in infancy
 Percy Selden Straus (1876–1944) who married Edith Abraham (1882–1957)
 Sara Straus (1878–1960) who married Dr. Alfred Fabian Hess (1875–1933)
 Minnie Straus (1880–1940) who married Dr. Richard Weil  (1876–1917)
 Herbert Nathan Straus (1881–1933) who married Therese Kuhnt (1884–1977)
 Vivian Straus (1886–1974) first married Herbert Adolph Scheftel (1875–1914) and second, in 1917, married George A. Dixon Jr. (1891–1956)

The couple was considered especially close by their friends and family. When Isidor traveled as part of his duties as a U.S. Representative for New York, or as co-owner of Macy's, they exchanged letters daily.

Ida spent the winter of 1911/1912 in Europe with her beloved husband Isidor. They originally planned to return home on a different ship, but switched to Titanic due to a coal strike in England that caused the coal from other ships to be diverted to Titanic.

Death and legacy

On the night of the sinking, Isidor and Ida were seen standing near Lifeboat No. 8 in the company of Mrs. Straus's maid, Ellen Bird. Although the officer in charge was willing to allow Isidor to board the lifeboat with the women, Isidor Straus refused to do so while women and children still remained on the ship. He urged his Ida to board, but she refused, saying, "We have lived together for many years. Where you go, I go." This incident was witnessed by numerous witnesses both in the lifeboat and on deck. The Strauses were last seen standing arm in arm on the deck.

The story of Ida's bravery and loyalty became much celebrated. Rabbis spoke to their congregations about her sacrifice; articles in Yiddish- and German-language newspapers extolled her courage; a popular song featuring the story, "The Titanic'''s Disaster", became popular among Jewish Americans.

Isidor's body was recovered but Ida's was not. A cenotaph at the Straus Mausoleum at Woodlawn Cemetery in the Bronx is dedicated to Isidor and Ida together. Its inscription  reads: "Many waters cannot quench love – neither can the floods drown it."  The work was designed by James Gamble Rogers, with sculpture by Lee Lawrie.

Portrayals
Ida Straus was portrayed by Helen Van Tuyl in the 1953 film Titanic. Helen Misener played her in the 1958 film A Night to Remember. She was portrayed by Nancy Nevinson in the 1979 TV movie S.O.S. Titanic. Janie Woods-Morris played her in the 1996 miniseries Titanic. She was portrayed by Elsa Raven in the 1997 film Titanic. Alma Cuervo played her in the 1997 Broadway musical Titanic.

Memorials

In addition to the cenotaph at Woodlawn Cemetery, there are three other memorials to Isidor and Ida Straus in their adopted home of New York City:
 The 34th Street main entrance to Macy's Department Store in Manhattan features two brass plaques — one commemorating the deaths of Ida and Isidor Straus, the other honoring employees who died in World War I.
 The Isidor and Ida Straus Memorial is located in Straus Park at the intersection of Broadway and West End Avenue at W. 106th Street (Duke Ellington Boulevard) in Manhattan.
 New York City public school P.S. 198 is the Isidor & Ida Straus School.

References

External links
 Straus Memorial on Titanic-Titanic.com
 
 Straus article at JewishEncyclopedia.com
 Judaic Treasures of the Library of Congress – includes information on The Titanic's Disaster sheet music
 Straus Historical Society
 Titanic: Triumph and Tragedy'', by John P. Eaton and Charles A. Haas, W.W. Newton & Company, 2nd edition 1995 

1849 births
1912 deaths
Deaths on the RMS Titanic
German emigrants to the United States
19th-century German Jews
American people of German-Jewish descent
People from Worms, Germany
People from Rhenish Hesse
People from the Grand Duchy of Hesse
Straus family
Spouses of New York (state) politicians
Burials at Woodlawn Cemetery (Bronx, New York)
19th-century American businesspeople